The 2016 season was Aalesunds FK's tenth consecutive season in the Tippeligaen.

Squad

Transfers

Winter

In:

Out:

Summer

In:

Out:

Friendlies

Competitions

Tippeligaen

Results summary

Results by round

Results

Table

Norwegian Cup

Squad statistics

Appearances and goals

|-
|colspan="14"|Players away from Aalesunds on loan:
|-
|colspan="14"|Players who appeared for Aalesunds no longer at the club:

|}

Goal scorers

Disciplinary record

References

Aalesunds FK seasons
Aalesunds